Carmen Kan Wai-mun is a Hong Kong solicitor and politician who has been a member of the Legislative Council for the Election Committee constituency which was newly created under the electoral overhaul imposed by Beijing.

Electoral history

References 

Living people
Year of birth missing (living people)
HK LegCo Members 2022–2025
Hong Kong pro-Beijing politicians